Leopold Antonovich Sulerzhitsky (September 27, 1872 – December 30, 1916) was a Russian theatre director, painter and pedagogue of Polish descent. He is associated with the Moscow Art Theatre and the household of Leo Tolstoy. Among his many students were Yevgeny Vakhtangov and Michael Chekhov.

A native of Zhitomir, Sulerzhitsky pursued study of the visual arts in Kiev. As a schoolboy he was involved in decorating St Volodymyr's Cathedral, working under the likes of Mikhail Vrubel and Viktor Vasnetsov. In 1890 he joined the Stroganov Art School in Moscow but dropped out four years later, due to his "anti-government escapades." Sulerzhitsky, always a colourful personality, turned his attention to theatre and soon became a fixture of Moscow artistic life.

Tatyana Tolstaya, one of his schoolmates, introduced him to her famous father. Sulerzhitsky grew fascinated with Leo Tolstoy's ideas of pacifism and anarchism and decided to dedicate his life to their dissemination. He became one of the most loyal Tolstoyans. His diary kept track of early Doukhobor life before, during, and just after the Doukhobor's migration to Canada at the beginning of the twentieth century. The published diary is called  To America with the Doukhobors.

Sulerzhitsky contributed greatly to the construction of one of the most successful actor training techniques in the world. He worked with Constantin Stanislavski for many years. In his book on Stanislavski's 'system' Mel Gordon attributes its founding to Stanislavski's nine-year relationship with Suler. He was well versed in Eastern-influenced religious practices, informing Stanislavski about yoga, meditation and the nature of Prana.

References

External links

 Sulerzhitsky's works online: Scenes from To America with the Doukhobors, by Jonathan Kalmakoff.

1872 births
1916 deaths
Burials at Novodevichy Cemetery
Moscow Art Theatre
Russian anarchists
Russian pacifists
Russian people of Polish descent
Russian theatre directors
Tolstoyans
Ukrainian people of Polish descent
Stroganov Moscow State Academy of Arts and Industry alumni